National Route 250 is a national highway of Japan connecting Nagata-ku, Kobe and Okayama in Japan, with a total length of 146.3 km (90.91 mi).

References

National highways in Japan
Roads in Hyōgo Prefecture
Roads in Okayama Prefecture